Glengarry and Stormont was a federal electoral district represented in the House of Commons of Canada from 1917 to 1925. It was located in the province of Ontario. This riding was created in 1914 from parts of Glengarry and Stormont ridings.

It consisted of the county of Glengarry and Stormont, with the townships of Cornwall and Roxborough, and the town of Cornwall.

The electoral district was abolished in 1924 when it was redistributed between Glengarry and Stormont ridings.

Election results

|}

On Mr. McMartin's death, 12 April 1918:

|| style="width: 180px; text-align:left;"|United Farmers-Labour||KENNEDY, John Wilfred ||align="right"|  7,581

|}

|}

See also 

 List of Canadian federal electoral districts
 Past Canadian electoral districts

External links 
Riding history from the Library of Parliament

Former federal electoral districts of Ontario